Oosterhuis is a Dutch surname meaning "eastern house". Notable people with the surname include:

Allard Oosterhuis (1902–1967), Dutch resistance hero during World War II
Anuska Oosterhuis (born 1978), Dutch media artist 
Huub Oosterhuis (born 1933), Dutch theologian, poet and former Catholic priest; father of Tjeerd and Trijntje
Jon Oosterhuis (born 1977), Canadian football fullback
Kas Oosterhuis (born 1951), Dutch architect
Peter Oosterhuis (born 1948), English golfer
Tjeerd Oosterhuis (born 1971), Dutch musician and producer, brother of Trijntje
Trijntje Oosterhuis (born 1973), Dutch singer and songwriter, sister of Tjeerd

See also
Oostershuis, a building in Antwerp and a headquarters of the Hanseatic League, erected about 1560 and destroyed by fire in 1893.

References

Dutch-language surnames